You Can't See 'round Corners is a 1969 Australian drama film directed by David Cahill and starring Ken Shorter and Rowena Wallace. The film is a theatrical version of the 1967 TV show You Can't See 'Round Corners. Both were based on the 1947 novel by Jon Cleary updated to the Vietnam War.

Synopsis
Small-time bookie Frankie McCoy from Newtown, Sydney, is drafted during the Vietnam War. He loves his girlfriend Margie but is frustrated because she won't sleep with him before they are married. He goes through basic training at Kapooka, near Wagga Wagga but eventually deserts. Margie breaks up with him once she finds this out.

Frankie goes back to working as a bookie but suffers a series of losses. In order to cover these he robs an office, not realising the money he has stolen consists of marked bills. He visits a Kings Cross night club, meeting a girl, Myra, who he sleeps with and gives some of the stolen money. Both the military and regular police start to close in on Frankie, and he discovers that the bills were marked. He goes back to Myra to retrieve the money. They get in an argument and he winds up accidentally killing her. He contacts Margie but is chased after by some of the men he owes money to and winds up running in front of a moving car and being killed.

Cast
 Ken Shorter as Frankie McCoy
 Lyndall Barbour as Mrs. McCoy
 Rowena Wallace as Margie Harris
 Judith Fisher as Peg Clancy
 Carmen Duncan as Myra Neilson
 Slim DeGrey as Mick Patterson
 Max Cullen as Peeper
 Kevin Leslie as Ken
 Goff Vockler as Barney
 Lou Vernon as Nugget
 John Armstrong as Jack Kelly
 Peter Aanensen as Sgt Quinn
 Max Phipps as Keith Grayson
 Vincent Gil as Lennie Ryan
 Henri Szeps as Peter
 Marion Johns as Mrs Harris
 John Barnes as Mr Harris
 Garry McDonald
 The Atlantics

Production
The film was shot in mid 1967, financed by the Seven Network. It used the same cast, crew and sets as the TV series. Very little of it was shot on location. It was a co-production between ATN 7 and Universal.

The film features appearances by a young Kate Fitzpatrick and Garry McDonald with hair.

Reception
The film was the 19th most popular movie at the Australian box office in 1969.

References

External links
 
You Can't See 'Round Corners at Australian Screen Online
You Can't See 'Round Corners (film) at National Film and Sound Archive
You Can't See Round Corners at Oz Movies

Australian drama films
1969 films
Films based on works by Jon Cleary
Films directed by David Cahill
1960s Australian films
1960s English-language films